The Harihar Express is an Express train belonging to Northern Railway zone that runs between  and  in India. It is currently being operated with 14523/14524 train numbers on Bi-weekly basis.

Service

The 14523/Harihar Express has an average speed of 48 km/hr and covers 1305 km in 26h 55m. The 14524/Harihar Express has an average speed of 48 km/hr and covers 1305 km in 26h 55m.

Route and halts 

The important halts of the train are:

Coach composition

The train has standard ICF rakes with max speed of 110 kmph. The train consists of 18 coaches:

 1 AC III Tier
 9 Sleeper coaches
 6 General
 2 Seating cum Luggage Rake

Traction

Both trains are hauled by a Ghaziabad Loco Shed-based WAP-5 electric locomotive from Barauni Junction to Ambala Cantonment Junction railway station and vice versa.

See also 

 Barauni Junction railway station
 Ambala Cantonment Junction railway station
 Himgiri Superfast Express
 Shaheed Express

Notes

References

External links 

 14523/Harihar Express
 14524/Harihar Express

Transport in Barauni
Transport in Ambala
Named passenger trains of India
Rail transport in Haryana
Rail transport in Uttar Pradesh
Rail transport in Uttarakhand
Rail transport in Bihar
Express trains in India